Major Cuthbert Bromley VC (19 September 1878 – 13 August 1915) was an English recipient of the Victoria Cross, the highest and most prestigious award for gallantry in the face of the enemy that can be awarded to British and Commonwealth forces.

Bromley was a son of John Bromley.

Bromley was a captain in the 1st Battalion, The Lancashire Fusiliers, British Army at the time of being awarded the VC for his actions on 25 April 1915, during the landings at W Beach, Gallipoli, Turkey, and during which he was wounded three times.

Citation

Bromley was wounded during the W Beach landing, and sustained a bullet injury to the knee on 28 April. He was wounded again during the Battle of Gully Ravine on 28 June, and was evacuated to Egypt to recover.

Bromley was promoted to acting Major on 13 June. Due to the illness of his commanding officer, taking command of the regiment in the Battle of Gully Ravine. Major Bromley was one of the six members of the regiment elected for the award, one of the famous "six VC's before breakfast". Bromley is remembered in his home town of Seaford on the War Memorial, and on a brass memorial in St. Leonard's Church. A road in the town is also named after him.

Medals
Bromley's medals were last heard of at an auction in the 1980s.

See also 
William Kenealy
Alfred Joseph Richards
Richard Raymond Willis

References

Monuments to Courage (David Harvey, 1999)
The Register of the Victoria Cross (This England, 1997)
VCs of the First World War: Gallipoli (Stephen Snelling, 1995)

External links
 The Lancashire Fusiliers in 1914-1918 at www.1914-1918.net

1878 births
1915 deaths
British Gallipoli campaign recipients of the Victoria Cross
Lancashire Fusiliers officers
British Army personnel of World War I
British military personnel killed in World War I
People educated at St Paul's School, London
People from Seaford, East Sussex
King's Regiment (Liverpool) officers
British Army recipients of the Victoria Cross
People lost at sea
Freemasons of the United Grand Lodge of England
British shooting survivors
Military personnel from London